There was one qualifier for Rugby World Cup 2011 from the Oceania region. The qualifying process began with the 2009 Oceania Nations Cup, with the winner going on to play Samoa.

The first stage was the four team Oceania Nations Cup. The Cup was played as a straight knock-out.  The winner then advanced to the final qualifier against Samoa, a two legged playoff to decide the Oceania Qualifier who faced South Africa, Wales, Fiji, and the African qualifier (Namibia) in Pool D

Oceania was the only region not to send a team to the 20th place playoff.

Round 1: Oceania Cup

Papua New Guinea won the 2009 Oceania Cup and advanced to Round 2.

Semi-finals

Final

Round 2: Oceania final
Samoa won 188-19 on aggregate and progressed to the 2011 Rugby World Cup finals as Oceania 1.

Home and away

References

2011
2011 Rugby World Cup qualification
World Cup